The Link River is a short river connecting Upper Klamath Lake to Lake Ewauna in the city of Klamath Falls in the U.S. state of Oregon. The "falls" from which Klamath Falls derives its name, and which in reality are best described as rapids rather than falls, are visible a short distance below the dam, though the water flow is generally insufficient to provide water flow over the rocks. The Klamath River begins at the narrow southern end of Lake Ewauna and flows  from there to the Pacific Ocean.

Before settlers came to the Klamath Basin, the Link River was known to the local Klamaths as Yulalona, meaning "back and forth." At times, strong winds blew the water upstream into Klamath Lake and partly drained the riverbed.

After its founding in 1867, Klamath Falls was originally named Linkville. The name was changed to Klamath Falls in 1892–93.

See also
List of rivers of Oregon

References

External links

Works cited
McArthur, Lewis A., and McArthur, Lewis L. (2003) [1928]. Oregon Geographic Names, 7th ed. Portland: Oregon Historical Society Press. .

Rivers of Oregon
Rivers of Klamath County, Oregon
Tributaries of the Klamath River